Nicoletta is the title character of an Italian humorous comic strip series, created in 1981, and published weekly in the comics magazine Il Giornalino.

Background 
It debuted on the 41st issue of the magazine Il Giornalino in October 1981. Paola Ferrarini (under the pen name "Lina") replaced Nizzi after a few episodes. 

The series tells the ordinary life of the teenager Nicoletta Marchini, struggling with the typical problems of her age. It had a large success, especially with the female audience.

References 

Italian comic strips
Nicoletta
Nicoletta
1981 comics debuts 
Female characters in comics
Nicoletta
Coming-of-age fiction
Comics about women